The list of ship launches in 1792 includes a chronological list of some ships launched in 1792.


References

1792
Ship launches